Omar Charef (born February 19, 1981) is a Moroccan football goalkeeper.

Charef spent most of his career playing for MC Oujda in the Botola, where he was considered one of the best keepers in the league.

Charef was involved in Morocco's 2004 Olympic football team's build-up to the finals, but did not appear as the team exited in the first round, finishing third in group D, behind group winners Iraq and runners-up Costa Rica.

References

1981 births
Living people
Moroccan footballers
Olympic footballers of Morocco
Footballers at the 2004 Summer Olympics
MC Oujda players
Association football goalkeepers